is a national highway connecting Takikawa and Kushiro in Hokkaidō, Japan.

Route data
Length: 298.4 km (185.5 mi)
Origin: Takikawa, Hokkaido (originates at junction with Routes 12 and 451)
Terminus: Kushiro, Hokkaido (ends at the origin of Route 44)
Major cities: Ashibetsu, Furano, Obihiro

History
1952-12-04 - First Class National Highway 38 (from Takikawa to Kushiro)
1965-04-01 - General National Highway 38 (from Takikawa to Kushiro)

Overlapping sections
In Ashibetsu, from North-2 West-1 South intersection to Ashibetsu-bashi intersection: Route 452
In Frano, from Wakamatsu-cho 15 intersection to Higashiyama-yanagi intersection: Route 237
In Shimizu, South-1-11 to South-4-11: Route 274
From Obihiro (Odori North-1 intersection) to Makubetsu (Akeno intersection): Route 242
From Urahoro (Yoshino-Kyoei intersection) to the terminus: Route 336
From Shiranuka (West-1 South-2 intersection) to Kushiro (Otanoshike intersection): Route 392
From Kushiro (Kitaodori-5 intersection) to the terminus: Routes 44, 272 and 391

References

038
Roads in Hokkaido